Harriet Nelson (formerly Hilliard; born Peggy Lou Snyder; July 18, 1909 – October 2, 1994) was an American actress. Nelson is best known for her role on the sitcom The Adventures of Ozzie and Harriet.

Early life and career
Nelson was born Peggy Lou Snyder in Des Moines, Iowa, the daughter of Hazel Dell née McNutt (1888–1971) and Roy Hilliard Snyder (1879–1953). She appeared on the vaudeville stage when she was three years old and made her debut on Broadway in her teens.

She frequented the Cotton Club, began smoking at age thirteen, was briefly married to an abusive comedian and lived what has been described as "a high-flying life". She wed the comedian, Roy Sedley (1901-1989), in 1930. They separated a year later, and the marriage was annulled in 1933. She left high school before graduating and joined the Corps de Ballet at the Capitol Theater, later dancing in the Harry Carroll Revue and working as a straight woman for comedians Ken Murray and Bert Lahr.  By 1932, she was still performing in vaudeville when she met the saxophone-playing bandleader Ozzie Nelson. Nelson hired her to sing with the band, under the name Harriet Hilliard. They married three years later.

Hilliard had a respectable film career as a solo performer, apart from the band. RKO Radio Pictures signed her to a one-year contract in 1936, and she appeared in three feature films, the most famous being the Fred Astaire-Ginger Rogers musical Follow the Fleet. She was very much in demand during the World War II years for leading roles in escapist musicals, comedies, and mysteries.

In Ozzie Nelson's book, he wrote that Harriet was quite popular during her short time at RKO, and that he and she wanted her to continue her solo film career. However, they decided it was more important for her to continue with the band and subsequent radio show.
 
Although the couple occasionally appeared together in movies, either as a duo (in Honeymoon Lodge) or as separate characters (in Hi, Good Lookin'!), they are best known for their broadcasting efforts. In 1944, the Nelsons began a domestic-comedy series for radio, The Adventures of Ozzie and Harriet. It was highly popular and made a successful transition to television. It was one of the stalwarts of the ABC-TV schedule from 1952 to 1966. The Nelsons' two sons, Ricky and David, were featured continuously on the show. Peter Jones, director of the television documentary Ozzie and Harriet: The Adventures of America's Favorite Family, has described Harriet Nelson: "She was a bombshell. She liked gay people. She liked a good off-color joke. She enjoyed her cocktails at night. She had the talent to go on and be a big star, but she made that decision to be Ozzie's wife."

In 1973, Ozzie and Harriet also appeared in the sitcom Ozzie's Girls.

In 2009, Harriet was included in Yahoo!'s Top 10 TV Moms from Six Decades of Television for the time period 1952–1966.

Personal life
Harriet Hilliard married bandleader Ozzie Nelson in 1935. They had two sons, David (born in 1936) and Eric (known as Ricky, born in 1940). The couple remained married until Ozzie's death from liver cancer in 1975. Her grandchildren include actress Tracy Nelson and musicians Matthew and Gunnar Nelson. She was also the mother-in-law of Rick's wife Kristin Harmon and David's wife June Blair.

Later years and death
In 1978, Harriet Nelson moved full-time to the Laguna Beach, California, beach home the family had built in 1954. She died of congestive heart failure on October 2, 1994. She is interred with her husband and younger son Ricky (who died in a plane crash in 1985) in the Forest Lawn Memorial Park, Hollywood Hills in Los Angeles.

For her contribution to the television industry, Harriet Nelson has a star on the Hollywood Walk of Fame at 6801 Hollywood Boulevard.

Filmography

References

External links

Iowa Rock'n Roll Music Association 2007 Hall of Fame Inductee
Ozzie and Harriet Nelson Papers at the University of Wyoming - American Heritage Center 

1909 births
1994 deaths
20th-century American actresses
American film actresses
American radio actresses
American television actresses
Burials at Forest Lawn Memorial Park (Hollywood Hills)
Actresses from Des Moines, Iowa
Traditional pop music singers
Vaudeville performers
RKO Pictures contract players
20th-century American singers
20th-century American women singers